Christmas in the Philippines is one of the biggest holidays in the country. The Philippines, one of the two predominantly Catholic countries in Asia (the other one being East Timor), celebrates the world's longest Christmas season. With Christmas music played as early as August, the holiday season gradually begins by September, reaches its peak in December with Christmastide, and concludes within the week after New Year's Day; however, festivities could last until the third Sunday of January, the feast day of the Santo Niño de Cebú. Officially, the holiday season is observed by the Catholic Church from the first day of Advent—the fourth Sunday before Christmas—to Epiphany (Three Kings' Day), which falls between January 2 and 8.

Etymology and nomenclature 
In Filipino and most Philippine languages, the word Paskó commonly refers to Christmas. It comes from the Spanish phrase "pascua de navidad"; the latter part, de navidad, fell out of use, leaving the word pascua to be assimilated into the local languages over the years. Meanwhile, the Spanish word pascua descended from Latin pascha, which was borrowed from Ancient Greek πάσχα (páskha), meaning "Passover". In other languages spoken in the country, including Chavacano (a Spanish-based creole), Hiligaynon, and Ilocano, the Spanish-derived pascua is still in use, although its spelling may vary. In Kapampangan, Pasku (or Pascu), related to Tagalog Paskó, is used. Krismas, a Filipinized rendering of the English word Christmas, is also used occasionally in non-formal contexts.

The word Paskó serves as the root word of some Christmas-related terms, such as Kapaskuhán, the name for the Christmas season; namamaskó, a caroller; pamamaskó, the act of caroling; pamaskó, a Christmas gift or present; and pampaskó or pang-Paskó, literally means "for Christmas" and may refer to clothing worn on Christmas Day.

History
The celebrations of Christmas in the Philippines have deep influences of Catholicism, tracing their roots back to Spanish colonial rule from 1521 to 1898. Currently, the Philippines holds the longest running festivity of the Christmas season in the world, which begins on September 1.

Activities
The various ethnic groups in the Philippines each observe different Christmas traditions, and the following are generally common.

Christmas traditions

Simbang Gabi and Misa de Gallo

Simbang Gabi ("Night Mass"; Spanish: Misa de Gallo, "Rooster's Mass", or Misa de Aguinaldo, "Gift Mass") is a novena of dawn Masses from December 16 to 24 (Christmas Eve). The Simbang Gabi is practised mainly by Catholic and Aglipayans, with some Evangelical Christian and independent Protestant churches have adopted the practise of having pre-Christmas dawn services. Attending the Masses is meant to show devotion to God and heightened anticipation for Christ's birth, and folk belief holds that God grants the special wish of a devotee that hears all nine Masses.

Morning observance of Simbang Gabi this holiday begins as early as 03:00 or as late as 05:30 (or rarely, 06:00 or 06:30) PST, while in some parishes, some churches and others, anticipated Masses begin the previous evening at 20:00 PST or as early as 17:00 or as late as 21:00 PST. After hearing Mass, Catholic families buy traditional Filipino holiday fare for breakfast outside the church and eat it either within the church precincts or at home. Vendors offer many native delicacies, including bibingka (rice flour and egg-based cake, cooked using coal burners above and under); putò bumbóng (a purple, sticky rice delicacy steamed in bamboo tubes, buttered then sprinkled with brown sugar and shredded dried coconut meat). Drinks include coffee, salabát (ginger tea) and tsokolate (thick, Spanish-style hot chocolate). Some Aglipayan churches invite the congregation to partake of the "paínit" (literally, "heater"), a post-Mass snack of mostly rice pastries served with coffee or cocoa at the house of the Mass sponsor. The bibingka and putò bumbóng are also served to those attending the anticipated evening Masses together with dinner.

Christmas Eve 
For Catholic Filipinos, Christmas Eve ("Bisperas ng Pasko" Spanish "Víspera de Navidad") on December 24 is celebrated with the Midnight Mass, and the traditional Noche Buena (Filipino Spanish "Good Night") feast. Family members dine together at around midnight on traditional yuletide fare, which includes: queso de bola (Filipino Spanish for "Cheese Ball"), which is made of edam sealed in red paraffin wax); tsokoláte, noodles and pasta, fruit salad, pandesal, relleno and hamón (Christmas ham). Some families would also open presents at this time.

Panunulúyan
In different provinces and schools, the journey of Joseph and the pregnant Virgin Mary in search of lodging is re-enacted. The pageant, traditionally called the "Panunulúyan", "Pananawágan", or "Pananapátan", is modeled after the Spanish Las Posadas.

The Panunulúyan is performed after dark, with the actors portraying Joseph and the Virgin Mary going to pre-designated houses. They perform a chant meant to rouse the "owners of the house" (also actors) to request for lodging. The owners then cruelly turn them away, sometimes also in song, saying that their house is already filled with other guests. Finally, Joseph and Mary make their way to the parish church where a replica of the stable has been set up. The birth of Jesus is celebrated at midnight with the Misa de Gallo.

Christmas Carols

At the beginning of Simbang Gabi / Misa de Gallo is when Filipinos form groups and go from house to house singing Christmas carols for the residents. This is known as "caroling", just as in the U.S. and other countries. They creatively in use recyclable materials to make makeshift instruments like drums and tambourines. Households give small amounts of money as a sign of appreciation for the carolers and as donations church choirs.

Christmas Day
Christmas Day in the Philippines is primarily a family affair. The Misa de Gallo is celebrated on December 25 and is usually one of several Masses that all family members (including non-churchgoers) are present. The Misa de Gallo is often celebrated between 10 pm and midnight, a schedule preferred by many Filipinos who stay up late on Christmas Eve for the night-long celebration of the Noche Buena. Fireworks and most merrymaking devices are sometimes used at the start of Christmas.

Preferably in the morning, Filipinos typically visit their extended family, especially to pay their respects to senior relatives. This custom of giving respect is enacted through the "Págmamáno". A supplicant takes the back of an elder's hand and presses it against the forehead while giving the greeting, Máno, pô (lit. "[Thy] hand, please"). The elder often responds by reciting a blessing or simply acknowledging the gesture, and in return gives "Aguinaldo" or money in the form of crisp banknotes, often placed in a sealed envelope such as an ang pao. Godparents in particular are socially obligated to give presents or aguinaldo to their godchildren, to whom they often give larger amounts compared to other younger relatives.

A festive lunch may follow the "Págmamáno". The menu is heavily dependent upon the finances of the family with richer families preparing grand feasts, while poorer families choose to cook simple yet special dishes. Some families choose to open presents on this day after the lunch.

When nighttime falls, members of the family usually return home or linger to drink, play parlor games, and chat. Some may opt to have another feast for dinner, while a minority spend the entire day at home to rest after the previous days' festivities.

Niños Inocentes
Holy Innocents' Day or Childermas is commemorated on December 28 as Niños Inocentes. Filipinos once celebrated the day by playing practical jokes on one another, similar to April Fool's Day. One of the widely practiced pranks on this day is to borrow money without the intention of paying back.  Creditors are usually helpless in getting remuneration from borrower, and are instead forewarned not to lend money on this day. Victims of such pranks were once called out, "Na-Niños Inocentes ka!"

New Year's Eve

On December 31 (Bisperas ng Bagong Taón), Filipino families gather for the Media Noche a lavish midnight feast that supposedly symbolizes their hopes for prosperity in the coming year, and lasts until the following morning as with the Noche Buena taken on Christmas Eve.

Filipinos make noise both to greet the New Year and in the belief that the din exorcises their surroundings of malevolent spirits. In spite of the yearly ban (due to the national government restrictions), people in most towns and cities customarily light firecrackers, or employ safer methods of merrymaking such as banging on pots and pans and blowing car horns.

Other traditions and beliefs include encouraging children to jump at the stroke of midnight to increase their height; displaying circular fruit such as oranges; wearing clothes with dots and other circular designs to symbolize coins and money; eating twelve grapes at midnight for good luck in the twelve months of the year (a Spanish custom); and opening all windows and doors to let in the blessings on the first day of the year.

Three Kings' Day
Christmas officially ends on the Feast of the Epiphany, more commonly known as Three Kings' Day (Spanish: Día de los Tres Reyes; Tagalog: Araw ng Tatlóng Harì), which falls on the first Sunday of January.

A dying tradition is the Hispanic custom of children leaving their shoes out by the window or the door, so that the Three Kings can leave small gifts like candy or money inside upon their descent on Twelfth Night.

Feast of the Black Nazarene

The Black Nazarene, whose devotees are primarily centered in Manila and Cagayan de Oro, is borne in procession on January 9 after a novena in its honor. The date commemorates the image's 1787 Traslación (solemn transfer) from its original location in what is now Rizal Park to its present shrine in the Quiapo District of the city.

Feast of the Santo Niño
The latest date for the end of popular Christmas celebrations is the Feast of the Santo Niño (Christ Child) on the third Sunday of January. The image depiction most associated with this day is the purportedly miraculous Santo Niño de Cebú, the first Christian icon brought to the islands. In 1521, Ferdinand Magellan came to Cebú and gave the image as a present to Humamay, chief consort of the local monarch, Raja Humabon, when she, together with her husband and a number of his subjects, were baptized into the Catholic faith. Tradition holds that Humamay—who received the Christian name Juana after Joan of Castile—danced for joy upon receiving the Santo Niño, providing a legendary origin for the fervent religious dancing during the Sinulog held in honor of the Christ Child. Celebrations are mostly focused in Cebu, where the Sinulog Festival is held, while there are other celebrations held nationwide in its honor, including the Ati-Atihan Festival in Aklan Province, the Dinagyang in Ilolio, the Kahimunan in Butuan, and the feasts of the Holy Child in the districts of Tondo and Pandacan in Manila. The National Cathedral or the Central Church of the Iglesia Filipina Independiente or Aglipayans is dedicated to the Santo Niño and other several parishes and missions around the country.

The Feast of Our Lady of the Candles
In older traditions (which are still kept in the liturgical calendar of the Extraordinary Form of the Mass) Christmas lasted until Candlemas, or the Feast of the Purification of Mary and the Presentation of the Baby Jesus at the Temple. This marked the end of a long 40-day "Christmastide" corresponding to the 40 days of Lent. This date falls on February 2, after Mary had participated in a rite of purification in according to the ancient Candlemas festival rooted in Halakha (Jewish law). This is also when Simeon makes his well-known prophecy to Mary and Joseph about the Holy Child, of Jesus being a light for the Gentiles. Many parishes, if possible will still keep their nativity scenes displayed up until the celebration of the Presentation of the Lord on February 2.

This final salvo is marked by the Feast of Our Lady of the Candles in Jaro, Iloilo City, where the image is enshrined in the Jaro Cathedral, the National Shrine of Our Lady of the Candles, where Tridentine Masses are celebrated in commemoration. Similar celebrations are held nationwide in towns where Our Lady of the Candles is its patroness, including Candelaria, Quezon, whose town fiesta is celebrated on this date.

Decorations

Due to secularization, decorations such as Santa Claus, Christmas trees, tinsel, faux evergreens, reindeer, and snow have become popular. Christmas lights are strung about in festoons, as the tail of the Star of Bethlehem in Belens, star shapes, Christmas trees, angels, and in a large variety of other ways, going as far as draping the whole outside of the house in lights. Despite these, the Philippines still retains its traditional decorations.

Paról

Every Christmas season, Filipino homes and buildings are adorned with star-shaped lanterns, called paról from the Spanish farol, meaning "lantern" or "lamp". These lanterns represent the Star of Bethlehem that guided the magi, also known as the Three Kings (Tagalog: Tatlóng Harì). Paról are as beloved and iconic to Filipinos as Christmas trees are to Westerners.

The most common form of the lantern is a 5-pointed star with two "tails" at the lower two tips. Other popular variations are four, eight, and ten-pointed stars, while rarer ones sport six, seven, nine, and more than twelve points. The earliest paróls were made from simple materials like bamboo, Japanese rice paper (known as "papél de Hapón") or crêpe paper, and were lit by a candle or coconut oil lamp. Simple paróls can be easily constructed with just ten bamboo sticks, paper, and glue. Present-day paról has endless possible shapes and forms and is made of a variety of materials, such as cellophane, plastic, rope, capiz shell, glass, and even recycled refuse. Paról-making is a folk craft, and many Filipino children often craft them as a school project or for leisure.

The Giant Lantern Festival is an annual festival held the Saturday before Christmas Eve in the San Fernando City, Pampanga. The festival features a competition of giant lanterns, and the popularity of the festival, has earned the city the moniker, "Christmas Capital of the Philippines".

Belén

Another traditional Filipino Christmas symbol is the belén—a creche or tableau depicting the Birth of Christ. Derived from the Spanish name for Bethlehem, Belén, it depicts the infant Jesus in the manger, surrounded by the Virgin Mary, St. Joseph, the shepherds, their flock, the Magi and some stable animals, and is surmounted by an angel, the Star or both.

Belén were introduced by the Spanish since the 16th century. They are an ubiquitous and iconic Christmas symbol in the Philippines, on par with the parol (Christmas lanterns depicting the Star of Bethlehem) which are often incorporated into the scene as the source of illumination. Both the Belén and the parol were the traditional Christmas decorations in Filipino homes before Americans introduced the Christmas tree. Most churches in the Philippines also transform their altars into a Belén at Christmas. They are also found in schools (which also hold nativity plays), government buildings, commercial establishments, and in public spaces.

Belén can be seen in homes, churches, schools and even office buildings; the ones on office buildings can be extravagant, using different materials for the figures and using Christmas lights, parols for the Star, and painted background scenery. A notable outdoor belén in Metro Manila is the one that used to be at the Manila COD department store building in Avenida Rizal in Manila from 1952 until the store and display itself was relocated to Cubao, Quezon City in 1966. In 2003, the belén was transferred to the Greenhills Shopping Center in San Juan when the COD building closed down in 2002. The last known display in Greenhills was held from November 2016 to January 2017, before returning to Cubao in November 2018 at the Times Square Park. This belén is a lights and sounds presentation, the story being narrated over speakers set up and most probably using automatons to make the figures move up and down, or turn, etc. Each year, the company owning it changes the theme from the Nativity Story, with variations such as a fairground story, and Santa Claus' journey.

Tarlac City, Tarlac is known as the "Belén Capital of the Philippines" holds the annual "Belenísmo sa Tarlac". It is a belén-making contest which is participated by establishments and residents in Tarlac. Giant versions of the belén with different themes are displayed in front of the establishments and roads of Tarlac for the entire season.

Caroling
In the Philippines, children in small groups go from house to house singing Christmas carols, which they called pangangaroling. Makeshift instruments include tambourines made with tansans (aluminum bottle caps) strung on a piece of wire. With the traditional chant of "Namamasko po!", these carolers wait expectantly for the homeowners to reward them with coins. Afterward, the carolers thank the generous homeowners by singing "Thank you, thank you, ang babait ninyo (you are so kind), thank you!"

An example of a traditional Filipino carol is a part of series known as "Maligayang Pasko", which is commonly called "Sa maybahay ang aming bati". The tradition of carols stems from the long years of Spanish rule, in which traditions practiced in Spanish Latin America during this time of the year were adopted to suit Philippine conditions.

Aguinaldo

This is a word heard repeatedly during the Christmas Season in the Philippines. Presently, the term is interpreted as gift or money received from benefactors. Aguinaldo is a Spanish term for bonus. Its prevalent use may have originated from Filipino workers of the Spanish era, receiving extra pay from the generosity of the rich employers during the celebration of the Christmas season.

See also 

 Holy Week in the Philippines

Notes

References

Works cited

External links 
 
 

 
Christian festivals in the Philippines
Public holidays in the Philippines